Dhorimana is a village and tehsil headquarters in Barmer district in the Indian state of Rajasthan. The population according to the Indian Census 2011 is around 6,513. The male population is 3,391 and female population is 3,122. Dhorimana is located in the southern part of the Barmar district forming a part of the Thar Desert. 

Villages in Barmer district
Tehsils of Barmer  district